Strigocossus cretacea is a moth in the family Cossidae. It is found in Madagascar.

References

Zeuzerinae